The Dirt of Luck is the first full-length album from American indie rock band Helium. It was released in April 1995 on Matador Records and was produced by Adam Lasus.

Recording
The album was partly recorded by Timony and Devlin, before bassist Ash Bowie joined the group.

Critical reception
Trouser Press wrote: "Best of all is the opener, 'Pat’s Trick,' a distorted, percussive exercise in sexual obsession made riveting by Timony’s fluttering-yet- powerful delivery." Salon wrote that "the arcing melodies on notable Dirt of Luck songs such as 'Pat's Trick' and 'Honeycomb' contort like a kite twisting in the sky, as Timony's dusky voice and noisy guitar hum add a steadying presence." Rolling Stone called the album an "off-kilter pop opus." Gimme Indie Rock: 500 Essential American Underground Rock Albums 1981-1996 called it "a beacon of progressive noise-pop."

Track listing

Personnel
Mary Timony - Organ, Bass, Guitar, Keyboards, Vocals, Xylophone
Ash Bowie - Bass, Guitar, Keyboards
Shawn King Devlin - Percussion, Drums
Adam Lasus - Producer, Engineer
Greg Calbi - Mastering

References

1995 debut albums
Helium (band) albums
Matador Records albums
Albums produced by Adam Lasus